Michael Arms (born 23 September 1989 in Auckland) is a New Zealand rower. He finished 7th in the men's quadruple sculls at the 2012 Summer Olympics.  He was part of the New Zealand men's eight that won the World Junior title at the 2006 World Junior Championships.

References

External links 
 
 
 

1989 births
Living people
Rowers from Auckland
Olympic rowers of New Zealand
Rowers at the 2012 Summer Olympics
New Zealand male rowers